Abenteuer in Bamsdorf is an East German adventure film directed by Konrad Petzold. It was released in 1958.

Cast
 Charlotte Küter as Oma
 Bernd Kuss as Toni
 Peter Schmidt as Klaus
 Petra Kyburg as Rita
 Klaus Böhme as Rolf
 Günter Wolf as Stippel
 Hans-Joachim Pfeil as Michel
 Sylvia Hunger as Bärbel
 Claudia Seidel as Reni

External links

1958 films
1950s children's adventure films
East German films
1950s German-language films
German children's adventure films
German sequel films
1950s German films